James Maxwell Moody, Sr. (born February 15, 1940) is a retired United States district judge of the United States District Court for the Eastern District of Arkansas.

Education and career
Moody was born in El Dorado, Arkansas. He received a Bachelor of Science in Information Management degree from the University of Arkansas in 1962. He received a Juris Doctor from the University of Arkansas School of Law in 1964 and passed the Arkansas bar examination in the same year.

He received a commission as a second lieutenant in the United States Army in June 1962 upon graduation from college. He served at Fort Sill, Oklahoma from September to November 1964, and then with the Second Armored Division from November 1964 to September 1966 at Fort Hood, Texas.

In 1976, he taught constitutional law at the University of Arkansas at Little Rock. From 1980 to 1988, he served as a stockholder and later director of a catering company.

He was in private practice in Little Rock, Arkansas in 1964 and from 1966 to 1995.

Federal judicial service
Moody was a United States District Judge of the United States District Court for the Eastern District of Arkansas. He was nominated by President Bill Clinton on June 27, 1995, to a seat vacated by Henry Woods. He was confirmed by the United States Senate on August 11, 1995, and received his commission on August 14, 1995. He assumed senior status on October 1, 2008, and retired on March 7, 2014.

Personal life
His son, James Maxwell Moody, Jr., serves as a judge on the same court. Moody had previously indicated he would retire from the court when his son was confirmed by the Senate. He later retired on March 7, 2014.

References

Sources

1940 births
Living people
20th-century American judges
21st-century American judges
Judges of the United States District Court for the Eastern District of Arkansas
United States district court judges appointed by Bill Clinton
University of Arkansas alumni
University of Arkansas School of Law alumni
United States Army officers
People from El Dorado, Arkansas